Madison County Schools is a school district in Madison County, Alabama, United States, headquartered in an unincorporated area, bordering Huntsville.

Communities in the district include: Gurley, Harvest, Hazel Green, Meridianville, Moores Mill, New Hope, Owens Cross Roads, New Market, Redstone Arsenal, and Triana. It also includes a few parcels of Huntsville.

Education
It is the 8th largest district in the state in terms of enrollment with approximately 19,700 students and 1,168 faculty.

There are 29 schools:

High schools
Buckhorn High School, New Market
Hazel Green High School, Hazel Green
 Madison County Career Tech Center, Huntsville
Madison County High School, Gurley
New Hope High School, New Hope
Sparkman High School/Sparkman 9th Grade Academy, Harvest

Other schools
Buckhorn Middle School, New Market
Meridianville Middle School, Meridianville
Monrovia Middle School, Huntsville
Sparkman Middle School, Harvest
Endeavor Elementary School, Harvest
Harvest Elementary School, Harvest
Hazel Green Elementary School, Hazel Green
Legacy Elementary School, Madison
Lynn Fanning Elementary School, Meridianville
Madison County Elementary School, Gurley
Madison Cross Roads School, Toney
Monrovia Elementary School, Huntsville
Moores Mill Intermediate, New Market
Mt. Carmel Elementary School, Huntsville
New Hope Elementary School, New Hope
New Market School, New Market
Owens Cross Roads School, Owens Cross Roads
Pace School, Huntsville
Riverton Elementary School, Huntsville
Riverton Intermediate School, Huntsville
Walnut Grove School, New Market
Central School, Huntsville

References

External links
 

Education in Madison County, Alabama
Huntsville, Alabama
School districts in Alabama